Primus (Latin, 'first') may refer to:

Arts, entertainment and media

Fictional entities
 Primus (DC Comics), a character in the Omega Men team
 Primus (Marvel Comics), a character created by Arnim Zola
 Primus, a character in the novel Stardust and its film adaptation
 Primus, a planet in The New Adventures of He-Man
 Primus, the creator of the Transformers

Other uses in arts, entertainment and media
 Primus (band), an American funk metal band
 PRIMUS (journal), a quarterly journal of undergraduate mathematics education
 Primus (TV series), 1971–1972

Businesses and brands
 Primus, a brand of keys by Schlage
 Primus AB, a Swedish manufacturer of portable cooking devices and outdoor stoves
 Primus stove, a pressurized-burner kerosene stove
 Primus beer, by Bralima Brewery in the Democratic Republic of the Congo
 Primus Telecommunications Group, Inc., now HC2 Holdings
 Primus Canada, Canadian ISP owned by Distributel
 Primus Telecommunications (Australia), a subsidiary of Vocus Communications

People
 Primus (name), including a list of people with the name
 Pope Primus of Alexandria, pope and patriarch of Alexandria 106–118
 Saint Primus (died c. 297), Christian martyr
 Marcus Antonius Primus 1st century Roman general

Other uses
 Primus of the Scottish Episcopal Church, the church's presiding bishop
 Primus (cycling team), a Polish women's road-racing team
 Primus Peak, a mountain in the U.S. state of Washington
 Patient Reported Outcome Indices for Multiple Sclerosis (PRIMUS), a medical research tool
 Adler Primus, a 1930s German small family car
 CAIGA Primus 150, a Chinese light aircraft
 Honeywell Primus, a range of glass cockpits by Honeywell Aerospace
 SSPH Primus, a Singaporean self-propelled howitzer

See also
 Prima (disambiguation)
 Prime (disambiguation)
 Secundus (disambiguation)